Erwin Hauer (January 18, 1926, Vienna, Austria - December 22, 2017, Branford, Connecticut) was an Austrian-born American sculptor who studied first at Vienna's Academy of Applied Arts and later under Josef Albers at Yale. Hauer was an early proponent of modular constructivism and an associate of Norman Carlberg. Like Carlberg, he was especially known for his minimalist, repetitive pieces in the 1950s and 1960s.

According to ribabookshops.com, Hauer's sculptures are in many public collections, including those of the Brooklyn Museum of Art, the Art Institute of Chicago, the Wadsworth Atheneum, the Museum of the National Academy of Design, and others. Erwin Hauer was Professor Emeritus at the Yale University School of Art, where he taught from 1957 until 1990.

Hauer's design studio in New Haven, Connecticut is well known for the production of sculptural, light-diffusing architectural screens and walls employing Hauer's modular style.

See also
Constructivism (art)
Minimalism

Notes

References
Galerie Chalette. Structured sculpture [exhibition]: December 1960–January 1961 (New York City: The Gallery, 1960). 
Hauer, Erwin. Erwin Hauer: Continua—architectural screens and walls by Erwin Hauer (New York: Princeton Architectural Press; London: Hi Marketing, 2004). ; 
Philadelphia Museum College of Art; Paul Darrow;  Ed Rossbach;  Walter Reinsel; Antonio Frasconi;  Herb Lubalin;  Helen Borten;  Henry Mitchell;  Erwin Hauer;  John Mason;  Lenore Tawney. Directors' choice: an exhibition at the Philadelphia Museum College of Art, Broad and Pine Streets, January 14 through February 7, 1961 (Philadelphia: Philadelphia Museum College of Art, 1961).

External links
Erwin Hauer's homepage, with Hauer bio
"Sculpting Infinity" article in Metropolis magazine, October 2006
New Arts Gallery information on Erwin Hauer including color images
Information on Erwin Hauer Studios from architonic.com
Ribabookshops.com information on Erwin Hauer
Marylandartsouce.com information on relation between Hauer and colleague Norman Carlberg at Yale
Yale University website page listing Erwin Hauer under "Faculty Emeriti"

1926 births
2017 deaths
20th-century American sculptors
20th-century American male artists
21st-century American sculptors
21st-century American male artists
American male sculptors
Yale University alumni
Place of birth missing
Austrian contemporary artists